Quincy is an unincorporated community in Monroe County, Mississippi.

Quincy is located at   approximately 8 miles east of Amory on U.S. Route 278.

References

Unincorporated communities in Monroe County, Mississippi
Unincorporated communities in Mississippi